Waśniewo may refer to the following places in Poland:

Waśniewo-Grabowo
Waśniewo-Gwoździe